Pierre Gillet (born 6 August 1960) is a French classical trumpeter.

Life 
Born in Terville, Gillet followed the teaching of Pierre Thibaud in the trumpet class at the Conservatoire de Paris where he obtained a first prize. He is in his turn an assistant trumpet teacher at the same school and a professor at the 20th arrondissement of Paris conservatory.

He has been solo trumpeter of the Concerts Colonne and he is also soloist of the orchestra of the Opéra Bastille in Paris since 1984.

Since 1982, Pierre Gillet has been a member of the "Ensemble de trompettes de Paris" (Eutepé). With other musicians he founded the "Orchestre de Cuivres de Paris" and is its director. He is a member of the Ars Nova and Septentrion ensembles (brass quintet with piano and percussion).

References

External links 
 Website of the EuTePe. Ensemble de Trompettes de Paris
 Website of the Orchestre de Cuivres de Paris
 Eutépé. Vivaldi. Four Seasons, Summer 3°mvt (YouTube)

1960 births
Living people
People from Moselle (department)
Conservatoire de Paris alumni
French classical trumpeters
Male trumpeters
20th-century French musicians
21st-century trumpeters
20th-century French male musicians
21st-century French male musicians